Bruno Portugal Paredes (born 28 June 2003) is a Peruvian footballer who plays as a forward for FBC Melgar.

Career statistics

Club

Notes

References

2003 births
Living people
People from Arequipa
Peruvian footballers
Association football forwards
FBC Melgar footballers
Peruvian Primera División players